Ihor Romanovych Perduta (born November 15, 1990) is a Ukrainian professional footballer who plays as a defender for FC Vorskla Poltava in the Ukrainian Premier League.

Club career 
Perduta was born in the family of the football player Roman Perduta and is the product of the Youth Sportive School FC Nyva Terebovlya and FC Nadiya Kopychyntsi's Youth Systems, and his first trainer was Oleh Stremynskyi.

Perduta's professional career continue, when he was promoted to FC Vorskla Poltava and on 10 May 2012 he made his debut for the Ukrainian Premier League.

International career 
He was called up to the senior Ukraine squad for a World Cup qualifier against Croatia in October 2017.

References

External links 
 
 

Ukrainian footballers
Ukraine student international footballers
FC Ternopil players
FC Nyva Ternopil players
FC Obolon-Brovar Kyiv players
FC Vorskla Poltava players
Ukrainian Premier League players
Ukrainian First League players
Ukrainian Second League players
Association football midfielders
1990 births
Living people
Sportspeople from Ternopil Oblast